The Women’s 50 metre butterfly at the 2014 IPC Swimming European Championships was held at the Pieter van den Hoogenband Swimming Stadium, in Eindhoven from 4–10 August.

Medalists

See also
List of IPC world records in swimming

References

butterfly 50 m women
2014 in women's swimming